Henri Heino (born June 14, 1986) is a Finnish professional ice hockey forward who currently plays for Jokerit of the SM-liiga.

References

External links

1986 births
Living people
Lahti Pelicans players
Jokerit players
Sportspeople from Lahti
Ässät players
Finnish ice hockey centres